This is a list of the songs recorded by Blind Joe Reynolds.

 Paramount Records,  in Grafton, WI
 "Cold Woman Blues" Paramount 12983, released 1929 
 "Nehi Blues" Paramount 12927, released 1929 
 "Ninety Nine Blues" Paramount 12983, released 1929 
 "Outside Woman Blues" Paramount 12927, released 1929 

 Victor Records, November 26, 1930 in Memphis, TN
 "Goose Hill Woman Blues" unreleased, believed lost
 "Married Man Blues" Victor 23258, released 1930 
 "Short Dress" unreleased, believed lost
 "Third Street Woman Blues" Victor 23258, released 1930

References 

Reynolds, Blind Joe